Papirio Silvestri (1592–1659) was a Roman Catholic prelate who served as Bishop of Macerata e Tolentino (1642–1659).

Biography
Papirio Silvestri was born in Cingoli, Italy in 1592.
On 14 July 1642, he was appointed during the papacy of Pope Urban VIII as Bishop of Macerata e Tolentino.
On 3 August 1642, he was consecrated bishop by Girolamo Verospi, Bishop of Osimo, with Giovanni Battista Altieri, Bishop Emeritus of Camerino, and Marco Antonio Coccini, Bishop of Anglona-Tursi, serving as co-consecrators. 
He served as Bishop of Macerata e Tolentino until his death in February 1659.

Episcopal succession
While bishop, he was the principal co-consecrator of:

References

External links and additional sources
 (for Chronology of Bishops) 
 (for Chronology of Bishops) 

17th-century Italian Roman Catholic bishops
Bishops appointed by Pope Urban VIII
1592 births
1659 deaths